Ribnica is a small village in Croatia, 25 km south-east of Zagreb. It is administratively a part of the city of Velika Gorica and it has a population of 803 (census 2011).

References

Populated places in Zagreb County
Velika Gorica